Teresa Abelleira Dueñas (born 9 January 2000) is a Spanish professional footballer who plays as a midfielder for Liga F club Real Madrid CF and the Spain women's national team.

Club career

Early career 
Abelleira began playing football as a child with her father and her brother. Besides playing football, Abelleira also played futsal while growing up. She became Spanish champion at the age of 16 with the club Poio Pescamar. Before joining Deportivo Abanca, she played for CD Lérez.

Deportivo (2016–2020) 
In 2016, after the recovery of the women's club section, Abelleira joined Deportivo Abanca of the Segunda División. On 4 September 2016, she made her debut in a draw against Oviedo Moderno.

On 6 August 2016, alongside her teammate Raquel Béjar, she became the first professional women footballer in Galicia.

After winning the title of Segunda División, Deportivo Abanca were promoted to Primera División. Abelleira made her Liga Iberdrola debut on 8 September 2019 in a 3–1 win against RCD Español. She was named MVP of the Match Week 7.

International career 
Abelleira was called into the Spain U17 squad for the 2016 UEFA Women's Under-17 Championship played in Belarus. Spain became runner-up in the competition.

She also played at the 2018 UEFA Women's Under-19 Championship, where she became a European champion.

Honours

Futsal 
Spanish Futsal Championship U16: 2016
Galician Futsal Championship U16: 2016

Football

Club 
Segunda División: 2018–19

International 
UEFA Women's Under-17 Championship: Runner-up: 2016
UEFA Women's Under-19 Championship: 2018

Individual 
La Liga Week 7 MVP: 2019–20

Personal life 
Abelleira is the daughter of football coach Milo Abelleira and her niece's godmother.

Abelleira, who is currently in a relationship with her former teammate Patricia Curbelo, received homophobic abuse when she came out. "I would kick them out, poor teammates. It's disgusting" was one of the comments she received. The couple say that they will continue to fight against homophobia.

References 

2000 births
Living people
Footballers from Pontevedra
Spanish women's footballers
Women's association football midfielders
Deportivo de La Coruña (women) players
Real Madrid Femenino players
Primera División (women) players
Spain women's youth international footballers
LGBT association football players
Spanish LGBT sportspeople
UEFA Women's Euro 2022 players